The following Union Army units and commanders fought in the Battle of Globe Tavern (August 18–21, 1864) of the American Civil War. Order of battle compiled from the casualty returns. The Confederate order of battle is listed separately.

Abbreviations used

Military rank
 MG = Major General
 BG = Brigadier General
 Col = Colonel
 Ltc = Lieutenant Colonel
 Maj = Major
 Cpt = Captain
 Lt = Lieutenant

Other
 w = wounded
 mw = mortally wounded
 k = killed
 c = captured

Army of the Potomac

V Corps

MG Gouverneur K. Warren, Senior Commander on the field

Escort: Lt John C. Paul
 4th Pennsylvania Cavalry (detachment)
Provost Guard: Maj Henry W. Rider
 5th New York (battalion)
Ambulance Train: Cpt William F. Drum

IX Corps

MG John Parke

Cavalry

Notes

References
 U.S. War Department, The War of the Rebellion: a Compilation of the Official Records of the Union and Confederate Armies. Washington, DC: U.S. Government Printing Office, 1880–1901.

American Civil War orders of battle